Dinorahon Mamadibragimova (born 8 June 1997) is an Uzbekistani taekwondo practitioner.

She won a bronze medal in bantamweight at the 2017 World Taekwondo Championships, after being defeated by Zeliha Ağrıs in the semifinal.

References

1997 births
Living people
Uzbekistani female taekwondo practitioners
Taekwondo practitioners at the 2018 Asian Games
World Taekwondo Championships medalists
Asian Games competitors for Uzbekistan
21st-century Uzbekistani women